Yarroweyah is a town in northern Victoria, Australia. The town is situated near the intersection of Kenny Road, Kokoda Road and the Murray Valley Highway.

History
Yarroweyah Post Office opened on 1 January 1882. In 1888 it was renamed Yarroweyah South when a new Yarroweyah post office opened to the north. This latter office closed in 1976.

After World War II, an extensive soldier settlement area was established to the south of Yarroweyah. The north–south roads built in the area were named after theatres of war, and the east–west roads after generals etc. (e.g. Tobruk, Labuan, Macarthur).

For over a century, area residents drilled individual wells to supply their water needs. In 2003 it was proposed to create a municipal distribution system; the residents approved the proposal, and work began. Based on a Cobram to Strathmerton pipeline, the system began providing culinary water in 2005. The Yarroweyah Football Club, nicknamed "The Hoppers", competing in the Picola & District Football League, are based in the town.

References

External links

Towns in Victoria (Australia)
Shire of Moira
Australian soldier settlements
1882 establishments in Australia